Events from the year 1914 in Denmark.

Incumbents
 Monarch – Christian X
 Prime minister – Carl Theodor Zahle

Events
 January – Film censorship is abolished.
 21 January – The Jerusalem Church in Tigensgade in Copenhagen is destroyed in a fire.
 17 February – The first smørrebrød shop opens in Copenhagen.
 7 March – Simon's Church is inaugurated in Copenhagen.
 1 August – The government declares Denmark's neutrality in World War I.
 31 August – The first (red) 1 krone bank notes enter circulation.
 19 September – The Lurblæserne monument is completed at City Hall Square in Copenhagen.
 3 October – St. Augustine's Church on Jagtvej in Copenhagen is inaugurated.
 20 December – A large Christmas tree is for the first time lit on City Hall Square in Copenhagen.

Undated

Sports

Date unknown
 Kjøbenhavns Boldklub wins the second Danish National Football Tournament by defeating B 93 42 in the final.

Births
 3 March – Asger Jorn, painter (died 1973)
 2 April – Hans Wegner, furniture designer (died 2007)
 13 April – Børge Mogensen, furniture designer (died 1972)
 5 July – Gerda Gilboe, actress and singer (died 2009)
 14 August – Poul Hartling, politician, former prime minister (died 2000)

Deaths
 11 January – Carl Jacobsen, brewer, industrialist and arts patron (born 1842)
 12 January – Anton Dorph, painter (born 1831)
 12 January – Louise Phister, actress (born 1816)
 4 July – Anna Syberg, painter, one of the "Funen Painters" (born 1870)
 13 August – Anders Petersen (historian), historian (died 1827)
 24 November – Carl Wentorf, artist (born 1868)

References

 
Denmark
Years of the 20th century in Denmark
1910s in Denmark
Denmark